Brooks County Independent School District is a public school district based in Falfurrias, Texas, USA. The district's boundaries duplicate those of Brooks County.

In school year 2021-2022, the school district was rated "B" by the Texas Education Agency.

High school aged students living in La Gloria Independent School District may attend Falfurrias High School of Brooks County ISD or Premont High of Premont Independent School District.

Schools
Falfurrias High School (grades 9-12)
Falfurrias Junior High School (grades 6-8)
Falfurrias Elementary School (grades 2-5)
Lasater Elementary School (prekindergarten-grade 1)

Texas partnerships
In 2019 under the leadership of Superintendent Dr. Maria Casas, Brooks County ISD launched three "Texas partnerships" under Senate Bill 1882.  These partnerships are: 
Falfurrias High School  with the Rural Schools Innovation Zone
Falfurrias Junior High School with the Rural Schools Innovation Zone
Falfurrias Elementary School with School Innovation Collaborative

References

External links
 

School districts in Brooks County, Texas
Education in Jim Wells County, Texas